Weinberg is a quarter in the district 6 of Winterthur, Switzerland.

It was part of Wülflingen municipality that was amalgamated into Winterthur in 1922.

References

Winterthur